Guo Jingming (born June 6, 1983), also known as Edward Guo, is a Chinese young adult writer. In addition to being an author and businessperson, Guo is also a teen pop idol and popular celebrity figure. On the other hand, Guo is a polarizing figure. In 2007, he was voted on Tianya.com, one of the country's biggest online forums, as China's "most hated male celebrity" for the third year in a row. Yet three of his four novels have sold over a million copies each, and by 2007, he was one of the best selling authors in China.

Guo is the president of Ke Ai Entertainment Company, which was established in 2004 by himself. Ke Ai mainly produces teen magazines such as "Top Novel" and "Island". In 2008, Guo Jingming signed a contract with Tian Yu Entertainment Company. Soon after, Guo was hired by Changjiang Publishing House in 2009 as a vice editor. Guo Jingming was the youngest member in China's Writers Association when he was just 23 years old. Guo is also a screenwriter and film director. Guo wrote and directed Tiny Times, Tiny Times 2, Tiny Times 3 and Tiny Times 4, all based on his own novels.

Early life 
Guo Jingming was born in a middle-class family in Zigong, Sichuan province, located in the southwest of China. Guo's father, Cheng Jianwei, is an engineer who works in a state-owned enterprise; his mother, named Zou Huilan, works in a local bank as a clerk. Guo showed strong interest in reading during his early years. His mother bought many books to inspire him in reading, explaining everything until Guo was able to understand. Guo was able to memorize what he read or heard, such as stories that people read to him. Guo was able to recite them after listening to it only once. Guo's mother strongly supported his interest in reading, and let him pick any books he liked in the store.

In 1988, Guo went to elementary school in his hometown, Zigong. Guo's reading ability improved in school. He expanded his reading volumes, which built up his foundational ability to write. Consequently, Guo became the best student in writing class.

Guo's writing talent emerged in his middle school years. Guo continued to read, including famous works Chinese literature and Wuxia fiction, especially those written by Jin Yong and Gu Long. Large amount of reading taught and inspired him more in writing, so that Guo started writing for magazines. In 1997, Guo published his first poem, "Loneliness", in a national magazine named "Rensheng Shiliuqi". "Loneliness" is a contemporary poem, expressing Guo's personal feelings of melancholy during school times. Guo received 10 RMB (approximately 1.5 US Dollars) as the remuneration from Rengsheng Shiliuqi magazine, and it meant a lot to Guo as well as his family.

Career

New Concept Writing Competition
With his mother's encouragement, Guo attended the third and fourth New Concept Writing Competition, a national writing game sponsored by Mengya Magazine. The "Script" and "Our Last Song on Campus" eventually won the first prize for both of the contests in 2001 and 2002 respectively. Guo's success rapidly spread throughout the nation. The "New Concept" contest transported Guo from Zigong to Shanghai, "a bustling and prosperous metropolis", where "I could easily find a lot more books to read than in my hometown," said Guo.

Writer
A year later, in 2003, Guo published his first novel—Huan Cheng(幻城). The novel sold 800,000 copies in the first couple months, which won him accolades as "one of the most popular writers" in China. Huan Cheng(幻城) has sold more than 1.5 million copies in the past years, which made Guo well-known and popular throughout the country.

While Guo finished his high school, he attended college in Shanghai, and determined to stay there after graduation; but Guo gradually realized that "he was caught up by the abundance of the city". However, Guo still decided to develop in Shanghai "with nothing and no one to help me except for the limited fame I gained through the writing contest". On Christmas Day in 2003, Guo gathered five of his close friends in the newest McDonald's in Shanghai, decided to establish a writing studio called "island". Since then, Guo has started his writing and business career in a  apartment studio.

Plagiarism
In the year of 2004, Guo published his second book named Never Flowers in Never Dream while he studied in Shanghai University. The book portrayed a triangle love "featuring harmless forays into the Beijing underworld". Never Flowers in Never Dream has sold 600,000 copies in the first month after releasing. However, soon after, a court found that the book has "shared 12 major plot elements and 57 similarities with another author". The novel that Guo was accused to plagiarize is named "In and Out of the Circle" written by Zhuang Yu. In 2006, the court made the final judgment, which announced that Guo Jingming has violated Zhuang Yu's copyright, and ordered him to pay Zhuang Yu 200,000 RMB (approximate $25,000) as compensation and apologize to Zhuang. Guo Jingming has paid the damage fee; however, he refused to apologize or admit the plagiarism, or talk about this case.	

Guo's success was muted by the controversy of plagiarism. After the affair of plagiarism, Guo has been called "Super Plagiarism Boy", "out-and-out thief", and "no sense of decency" by outraged people; however, it did not affect the support of his fans. Guo's next musical album and novel still sold very well, so that Guo responded that "I felt upset but soon realized that selling well was where strength lay". Guo's attitude to plagiarism was positive, he said people criticize him because they never read his book, so he would not pay any attentions to their false judgments, though he hates to be misunderstood. Guo also announced that he would prove to people they were wrong even if it would take ten years to clarify.

On December 21, 2020, Guo and Yu Zheng were highlighted in a joint letter signed by 111 Chinese film and television industry insiders. The joint letter called for immediately stop the publicity and hype of the two who have plagiarism and bad traces, and revise and adjust the related variety shows they are currently participating in. On December 31, 2020, Guo and Yu Zheng issued their own individual apology through their respective Weibo accounts after 156 had signed the letter. Guo also offered Zhuang Yu all the revenue he received from 'Never Flowers in Never Dreams' as a form of compensation.

Works

City of Fantasy
Guo's first book, The City of Fantasy (幻城), was first published as a series on the magazine Meng Ya. Guo achieved overnight success in 2003 when his novel City of Fantasy launched on Beijing's book market. Having sold over 1.5 million copies, the book ranked second on the best-seller list, just after the famous writer Chi Li's novel.

Tiny Times
A series of books containing 3 books entitled 1.0, 2.0, 3.0, following a group of young girls on their journey as they navigate between relationships, work and friendship in Shanghai.

Legend of Ravaging Dynasties
A series of books in memory of Guo's 10-year writing career.

Rush to the Dead Summer
A romance novel about several young students.

Filmography
Tiny Times (2013)
Tiny Times 2 (2013)
Tiny Times 3 (2014)
Tiny Times 4 (2015)
Ice Fantasy (2016)
YES! MR FASHION (2016) 
L.O.R.D: Legend of Ravaging Dynasties (2016)
Rush to the Dead Summer (2017)
Cry Me A Sad River (2018–2019)
L.O.R.D: Legend of Ravaging Dynasties 2 (2020)
 The Yin-Yang Master: Dream of Eternity (2020)

References

 
1983 births
Living people
Chinese children's writers
Writers of young adult literature
Chinese publishers (people)
Writers from Zigong
Businesspeople from Sichuan
Film directors from Sichuan
Chinese male novelists